Bykovo is a rural locality (a village) in Gorodishchenskoye Rural Settlement, Nyuksensky District, Vologda Oblast, Russia. The population was 19 as of 2002.

Geography 
Bykovo is located 42 km southeast of Nyuksenitsa (the district's administrative centre) by road. Lopatino is the nearest rural locality.

References 

Rural localities in Nyuksensky District